is a female Japanese singer affiliated with management agency S, run by veteran singer Hiromi Satō. She is known for many of her songs being in video games and anime.

Her stage name was given by composer Noriyasu Agematsu. She is affectionately called "Feinyan" by her fans.

Faylan debuted as a singer in 2005 by singing an insert song for game adaption of Girls Bravo. During her independent time, she worked as a doujin singer and released music through Comiket. She released one single, in 2007 under Hobi records label, before she was recruited by Lantis. Her first single with Lantis was "Mind as Judgment" in 2009. Since then, all her CDs have been released under Lantis. She is also signed with Sony Music Artists. Some of her songs were used as themes for some anime series, including Canaan, Future Diary, Mobile Suit Gundam AGE and BlazBlue Alter Memory.

In 2009, Faylan contributed to a cover of the song "Imagine (John Lennon song)" in a group called "Anison All-Stars" in order to tackle world hunger. In 2016, Sato announced Faylan would be going on an extended hiatus due to an autoimmune disease. This hiatus ended the same year in October.

Discography

Singles
, April 6, 2007
"mind as Judgment" – July 22, 2009
"I Sing by My Soul" – November 11, 2009
"Errand" – January 27, 2010
"SERIOUS-AGE" – May 26, 2010
"Senjou ni Saita Ichirin no Hana" – July 21, 2010
"Last Vision For Last" – October 27, 2010
 – November 24, 2010
 – January 26, 2011
 – April 27, 2011
"Tomoshibi" – May 25, 2011
"Blood teller" – November 9, 2011
"Dead END" – January 25, 2012
"Sōkyū no Hikari" – March 16, 2012
"WHITE justice" – May 23, 2012
"Realization" – August 8, 2012
"God FATE" – January 23, 2013
"wonder fang" – July 24, 2013
"Blue Blaze" – October 23, 2013
"Yasashisa no Tsubomi" – April 30, 2014
"Tokyo Zero Hearts" – July 30, 2014

Albums

Live
"Flying Dutch Live Tour 2010 Polaris" – October 4, 2010
"Anisama Girls Night Live" – October 31, 2010
"Connichi – Kassel Germany" – September 8, 2012

Compilations
, released March 24, 2005 (Lantis)
 "Just Believe in Love"
Elements Garden, released August 6, 2008 (King Records)
 "Never Slash!!"
 "Reconquista"
, released December 25, 2008 (Lantis)
 "Dark Side of the Light"
 
 "If"
 "Reincarnation"
 "Distance Point"
, released March 25, 2009 (Lantis)
 "Fortitude"
, released July 24, 2009 (Lantis)
 "Conspire"
Canaan Inspired Album, released November 11, 2009 (Lantis)
 
 
 
 
 
Gundam Tribute from Lantis released December 9, 2009 (Lantis)

Other
Katanagatari Episode 11 Dokutou Mekki Blu-ray Disc and DVD (Special Editions) Bonus CD, to be released February 2, 2011 (Aniplex)
  – Katanagatari series ending theme No. 11
Chaos Rings Original Soundtrack, released on iTunes
 Together at Dawn – Chaos Rings insert theme
Grisaia no Meikyuu Soundtrack
  Grisaia no Meikyuu insert theme

References

External links
 
 

Living people
Musicians from Saitama Prefecture
Anime musicians
21st-century Japanese singers
21st-century Japanese women singers
1982 births